Francisco Bergamín y García (6 October 1855, in Campillos, Spain – 13 February 1937, in Madrid, Spain) was a Spanish lawyer, economist and politician who served as Minister of State in 1922, during the reign of King  Alfonso XIII.

Sources
Personal dossier of D. Francisco Bergamín. Spanish Senate

Economy and finance ministers of Spain
Foreign ministers of Spain
1855 births
1937 deaths
Conservative Party (Spain) politicians
Interior ministers of Spain